Jordan Meredith (born January 4, 1998) is an American football center and guard for the Las Vegas Raiders of the National Football League (NFL). He played college football for Western Kentucky.

Professional career

Los Angeles Rams
Meredith signed with the Los Angeles Rams as an undrafted free agent but was released before the start of the 2021 season.

Las Vegas Raiders
Meredith was signed by the Las Vegas Raiders on February 19, 2022. He was waived on July 20, but re-signed with the team on July 25 after Denzelle Good retired.

He made his NFL debut in a Week 15 win against the New England Patriots.

References

External links
Western Kentucky bio

1998 births
Living people
Sportspeople from Bowling Green, Kentucky
Players of American football from Kentucky
American football guards
American football centers
Western Kentucky Hilltoppers football players
Las Vegas Raiders players